Bernard Makufi (born 6 January 1979) is a Zambian retired football striker. He was a squad member at the 2000 African Cup of Nations.

References

1979 births
Living people
Zambian footballers
Zambia international footballers
Nkana F.C. players
IFK Hässleholm players
Association football forwards
Zambian expatriate footballers
Expatriate footballers in Sweden
Zambian expatriate sportspeople in Sweden
Ettan Fotboll players
2000 African Cup of Nations players